Lucknow–Kanpur Suburban Railway System is a commuter rail service operated by Northern Railways, North Central Railway and North Eastern Railway to connect administrative capital Lucknow  with the economic and industrial capital Kanpur  of the state Uttar Pradesh. These services are mostly run using EMU and MEMU rakes. However it does not have dedicated suburban tracks but share the tracks with long distance trains.
It is fondly called LC meaning Lucknow Cawnpore (old name of Kanpur).
Most of the LC trains covers the whole journey within 1 hr and 50 minutes.
Intercity and other Superfast trains take 1 hour 30 minutes.
Shatabdi Express takes 1 hour 15 minutes for whole journey.

EMU and MEMU trains

Lucknow to Kanpur

Kanpur to Lucknow

NOTE
64260 originates from Panki at 6:00 am via Govindpuri Railway Station.
64214 originates from Kanpur Anwarganj at 6:00 pm .

Other Trains

Kanpur to Lucknow

Lucknow to Kanpur

See also
Barabanki-Lucknow Suburban Railway
Cawnpore-Barabanki Railway
Kanpur Central
Charbagh Railway Station
Indian Railways
Kanpur Lucknow Roadways Service

References

External links
 

Transport in Lucknow
Suburban rail in India
Transport in Kanpur
Rail transport in Uttar Pradesh